Raab is a German surname. Notable people with the surname include:

Antoine Raab, German association footballer
Antonius Raab, German aeroplane designer
Ben Raab, comic book writer
Chris Raab, MTV personality
Dominic Raab, British politician
Eleonore von Raab (1755 – ), Austrian collector of minerals
Franz Anton von Raab (1722-1783), Austrian agrarian reformer
Herbert Raab, Austrian software engineer and amateur astronomer 
 Captain Harmon Raab, fictional army Captain in the TV show, JAG (TV series)
Ignác Raab, Czech Jesuit brother and painter
Jennifer Raab, president of Hunter College
Julius Raab, Austrian politician
Kurt Raab, German actor
Leopold Friedrich Raab (born 1721), German violinist and composer
Marc Raab (born 1969), American football player
Michael Raab (born 1982), American butterfly swimmer
Rachel Raab, American photographer
Selwyn Raab, American journalist and writer
Stefan Raab (born 1966), German entertainer
Susanne Raab (born 1984), Austrian politician
William von Raab (1942–2019), American attorney 

German-language surnames
Czech-language surnames
Surnames from nicknames